The B41 is a bus route that constitutes a public transit line operating in Brooklyn, New York City, running along Flatbush Avenue between Downtown Brooklyn and Marine Park. The B41 is operated by the MTA New York City Transit Authority. Its precursor was a streetcar line that began operation in 1860, and was known as the Flatbush Avenue Line. The route became a bus line in 1951. Limited-stop service began along the route in 1992.

Route description and service 
Southbound B41 service begins at Downtown Brooklyn at Cadman Plaza West by the Borough Hall station. The bus then runs via Adams Street to Livingston Street, before running via that street until turning onto Flatbush Avenue. Bus service continues southeast via Flatbush Avenue until Avenue P, where service splits into two branches. Most buses continue along Flatbush Avenue to a terminal at Kings Plaza, while the remainder run along Avenue N and Veterans Avenue to a terminal at Veterans Avenue and East 71st Street, near Avenue U, in Bergen Beach.

During the day, the B41 employs limited-stop service between Atlantic Avenue and Avenue P, and local elsewhere. During weekdays, limited stop service operates between Downtown Brooklyn and both of its southern terminals. There is usually more service operating to Kings Plaza than Bergen Beach, especially during off-peak hours. During weekends, all Bergen Beach service is local, with Limited service going to Kings Plaza. During overnight service, the Limited does not run, and the B41 Local alternately serves each southern terminal.

History

As a horsecar and streetcar line
The Brooklyn City Railroad opened the line, a branch of their Fulton Street Line, to the city line on July 14, 1860, and to Vernon Avenue in Flatbush about a week later. The Vernon Avenue Depot was built on the east side of the line at the terminal. The line was later extended to Bergen Beach along Flatbush Avenue and Avenue N, and later still the line along Flatbush Avenue was extended to Avenue U in Marine Park; the older route became the Bergen Beach Shuttle.

As a bus line
Buses were substituted for streetcars on March 4, 1951. 

Limited-stop service was added on September 14, 1992. In September 1996, all trips on the route were slated to be cut back to the alternate terminal at Tillary Street and Cadman Plaza West from Old Fulton Street at Fulton Landing as part of a reconfiguration of service in Downtown Brooklyn. The change took effect on March 30, 1997. This -long section was eliminated as it duplicated B25 service, because this section was underutilized, with an average of 1.5 passengers per trip, and because the shorter route would increase the B41's reliability. B25 service was made 24/7 to make up for the loss of Sunday service to Fulton Landing.

On December 1, 2022, the MTA released a draft redesign of the Brooklyn bus network. As part of the redesign, all Bergen Beach branch service would be replaced by the B40, which would run from Bergen Beach to Prospect Park station, making local stops along Avenue N (Veterans Avenue) and limited stops along Flatbush Avenue. The B41 Limited would be replaced with the B41 Crosstown, which would continue to run from Downtown Brooklyn to Kings Plaza, making limited stops south of Kings Highway. In Downtown Brooklyn, the B41 and B41 Crosstown would run via Livingston Street, Smith Street, Joralemon Street, Boerum Place, and Livingston Street. Closely spaced stops would also be eliminated.

References

Streetcar lines in Brooklyn
B041
B041